List of assassinated and forcibly disappeared Roman Catholic priests working in Guatemala.

References

 
Guatemala religion-related lists
Human rights abuses in Guatemala
People murdered in Guatemala
Guatemala crime-related lists